Lupfen is a mountain of Baden-Württemberg, Germany. The mountain is called "King of the Baar" as it is an outlier. Hohenlupfen Castle was located on this mountain, which is where the Counts of Lupfen had resided for 500 years.

References 

Mountains and hills of the Swabian Jura